Cloonigny Castle is a tower house and National Monument located in County Galway, Ireland.

Location

Cloonigny Castle is located 4 km (2½ mile) northeast of Kilconnell.

History
Cloonigny Castle, now in ruins, with its moated site, was occupied by Shane De Moy (O'Kelly) in 1574.

It is surrounded by a well-preserved moated site, defined by two banks with an intervening fosse. The inner bank is well preserved and there is a mound defined by a scarp and an external fosse. Close by is a ringfort containing a souterrain.

References

National Monuments in County Galway
Castles in County Galway